Wang Niansun (1744–1832), courtesy name: Huaizu was a Chinese scholar of the Qing Dynasty.

Biography
A native of Gaoyou, Jiangsu, he worked as a government official specializing in channelization before retiring to devote himself to his studies. As an official, he is still remembered today for having the guts to impeach the corrupt high-ranked official Heshen.

A student of Dai Zhen, Wang is most famous for his commentary on the ancient thesaurus Guangya, Guangya shuzheng (廣雅疏證 "Guangya Annotations and Proofs"), which he spent a whole decade to complete. In his commentary he demonstrated his philological principle of "looking for the ancient meaning by considering the ancient sound ... not constrained by the structure of the character". Although he was not the first one to point out this principle, he was the first one to demonstrate it in an exemplary manner.

His Dushu zazhi (讀書雜誌 Miscellaneous Notes on the Classics) is also a philological treasure house, especially valuable for its textual criticism of ancient texts.

His son Wang Yinzhi was also an important philologist. They are often referred together as "Father and Son Wang of Gaoyou".

References
He Jiuying 何九盈 (1995). Zhongguo gudai yuyanxue shi (中囯古代语言学史 "A history of ancient Chinese linguistics"). Guangzhou: Guangdong jiaoyu chubanshe.
Wang Zhangtao 王章涛 (2006). Wang Niansun, Wang Yinzhi nianpu (王念孙, 王引之年谱 "Chronology of Wang Niansun and Wang Yinzhi"). Yangzhou: Guangling shushe.
Zhongguo da baike quanshu (1980-1993). 1st Edition. Beijing; Shanghai: Zhongguo da baike quanshu chubanshe.

Linguists from China
Qing dynasty politicians from Jiangsu
1744 births
1832 deaths
Writers from Yangzhou
Qing dynasty historians
Politicians from Yangzhou
Historians from Jiangsu
19th-century Chinese historians
Qing dynasty classicists